Richa Pallod is an Indian model and actress who predominantly appears in Hindi films. Besides Hindi, she has been featured in  Telugu, Tamil, Kannada and Malayalam language films. After appearing as a child artiste in Lamhe (1991), she appeared in an award-winning role in Nuvve Kavali (2000), her first film in Telugu.

Her most notable Hindi film include Yash Raj Films' Neal 'n' Nikki (2005). Her roles in Tamil films Shahjahan (2001) and Unakkum Enakkum (2006) are noted whilst she has also featured in Kannada and Malayalam language films.

Personal life 
She married Himanshu Bajaj, sometime around 2011 and their son was born around 2013.

Career
Richa Pallod made her entry into films with a minute role as a child artiste in the film Lamhe (1991) and Pardes (1997). She started modelling at the age of 16, has featured in over five hundred commercials and appeared in Falguni Pathak's music videos "Yaad Piya Ki Aane Lagi" and "Piya Se Mil Ke Aaye Nain". Richa made her film debut in the Telugu film, Nuvve Kavali (2000), opposite Tarun, whom she had previously appeared with in a commercial shot by Rajiv Menon. The film, which portrayed love between two childhood friends in college, became a huge commercial success and won favourable reviews with claims that Richa "did not seem like a debutant" in her role. Her performance in the film won her the Filmfare Award for Best Actress – Telugu.

She made her debut in Tamil cinema, playing the lead role opposite Vijay in Shajahan. The film was appreciated by critics and Richa's performance was noted to have "done little good". Her second Tamil film was Alli Arjuna, directed by noted film maker Saran featuring Manoj Bharathiraja. Richa played the role of an independent girl being romantically pursued by Manoj, but once again received unfavourable reviews with reviewers citing that "you do not feel for Richa".

Her first Hindi film as a lead artiste was opposite Fardeen Khan in Kuch Tum Kaho Kuch Hum Kahein, a critical and commercial failure. Richa claimed that the lack of promotion of the project might have been the reason for the dull response towards the film. Her subsequent Hindi films within the next two years, including two films opposite actor Rakesh Bapat, were low-budget projects and did not fare well at the box office. Similarly, her projects in Kannada, Cheppale and Jootata, opposite Sameer Dattani also failed commercially, with reviews criticising Richa's performance in the latter. Richa went on to appear in Yash Raj Films' Neal 'n' Nikki, featuring Uday Chopra and Tanishaa Mukerji, playing the role of Sweety. After several of her previous ventures failed to succeed, Richa appeared in a supporting role in Unakkum Enakkum (2006).

Richa went on to claim that poor public relations and lack of promotion led to her disappearance from films before returning in 2009, with her first appearance in a Malayalam film in the Mammootty-starrer, Daddy Cool. Playing the role of Annie Simon, mother of an eight-year-old, her role won critical acclaim and the film was a commercial success. In 2010, she appeared in the Telugu language film, Inkosaari alongside Raja and Manjari Phadnis. However, the film failed to succeed commercially as it was released alongside the hit film, Ye Maaya Chesaave, which went on to attract more viewers. Towards the end of her career as a lead actress, Richa featured in the making of two low-budget unreleased Tamil films, Nalvaravu and Kadhal Kalvan. In 2011, she was chosen to be one of the Hindi-dubbing artistes for the Hindi dubbed version of the Hollywood film, X-Men: First Class, when it was released in theatres, shortly after its North American release, dubbing for Rose Byrne's role as Moira MacTaggert.

Richa took a sabbatical from acting for a few years after her wedding, before appearing in Yagavarayinum Naa Kaakka / Malupu (2015) in a supporting role.

Filmography

Films

Television

Web series

References

External links

 
 

Year of birth missing (living people)
Actresses from Bangalore
Indian voice actresses
Rajasthani people
Indian film actresses
Actresses in Hindi cinema
Actresses in Tamil cinema
Living people
Actresses in Malayalam cinema
Filmfare Awards South winners
20th-century Indian actresses
21st-century Indian actresses
Actresses in Telugu cinema
Actresses in Kannada cinema
Actresses in Hindi television